Jason Tahincioğlu (born 29 October 1983 in Bristol, United Kingdom), also known as Jason Tahinci, is a Turkish-British auto racing driver born into a car racing family.

Career
Tahincioğlu started driving mini kart at the age of six. In 1990, he debuted in kart racing. From 1991 on, he became champion in mini kart racing for four successive years. Tahincioğlu moved up then in 1995 to Promo kart series and became second after his elder sister Raina Tahincioğlu. The next year, he went to the Netherlands to participate at the championships there and became 5th among 24 drivers. Returned to Turkey, Tahincioğlu became champion in Promo series in the years 1997 and 1998. During this time, he participated also at the European Junior championships. He moved to Super kart category and became champion in 1999 and 2000. Tahincioğlu ended his kart racing career with 8 Turkish champion titles.

Tahincioğlu experienced the taste of driving a Formula Three racing car first time on his birthday in 1998 as a gift from his father Mümtaz Tahincioğlu, long-time president of Turkish Motorsports Federation (TOSFED) and FIA Council Member. In 2000, he debuted in the Turkish Formula Three Championship and finished in second place. In 2001, he did not race to finish high school. Since 2002, he competed in the British Formula Renault championship finishing 20th in 2005. In August 2005, Jason Tahincioğlu became the first ever Turkish racer to drive a Formula One car when he completed test runs for Jordan Grand Prix on a Toyota TF105 at the Silverstone Circuit.

In 2006, Tahincioğlu became the teammate of Luca Filippi in the GP2 team FMS International, with the Turkish gasoline company Petrol Ofisi named as their new sponsor at the same time. He signed a two-year deal with the team, matching the sponsorship deal made as a part of Petrol Ofisi's backing extension. Despite scoring no points, he was retained for the second year of his contract in 2007.

In 2006 he also raced in the Turkish leg of the World Series by Renault. He competed in both races in the 3.5 class.

For the 2008 season, he competed for the BCN Competicion team in the GP2 Asia Series. In the same year, he was also a test driver for the Galatasaray team in the inaugural Superleague Formula season, having revealed he was a lifelong fan of Galatasaray.

Tahincioğlu was educated in automotive engineering at the University of Bath in England.

Racing record

Career summary

Complete GP2 Series results
(key) (Races in bold indicate pole position) (Races in italics indicate fastest lap)

Complete GP2 Asia Series results
(key) (Races in bold indicate pole position) (Races in italics indicate fastest lap)

References

External links

 Jason Tahinci at GP2 in Eurosport
 Jason Tahinci at GP2 Series

1983 births
Living people
Alumni of the University of Bath
English people of Turkish descent
Turkish people of English descent
British Formula Renault 2.0 drivers
Auto GP drivers
GP2 Series drivers
GP2 Asia Series drivers
European Le Mans Series drivers
Sportspeople from Bristol
Turkish racing drivers
World Series Formula V8 3.5 drivers
Turkish Formula Three Championship drivers
Turkish engineers
Turkish expatriate sportspeople in England
Mark Burdett Motorsport drivers
Jota Sport drivers
EuroInternational drivers
Team Astromega drivers
British Formula Three Championship drivers
CRS Racing drivers
Scuderia Coloni drivers
GT4 European Series drivers